Jeanette Hain (born  18 February 1969, Munich) is a German film actress. She appeared in more than 90 film and television productions since 1990. Hein is perhaps best-known to international audiences as Ralph Fiennes' girlfriend in the Academy Award-winning film The Reader (2008).

Filmography (selection) 
  (1998)
  (1998)
 Requiem for a Romantic Woman (1999)
 The Farewell (2000)
 The Journey to Kafiristan (2001)
 The Architects (2004, TV film)
 Bis in die Spitzen (2005, TV series)
 The Reader (2008)
 The Countess (2009)
 Germany 09 (2009)
 The Young Victoria (2009)
 Transfer (2010)
 The Poll Diaries (2010) 
 Run Boy Run (2013)
 The Forbidden Girl (2013) 
 Head Full of Honey (2014).
 Never Look Away (2018)

External links

Jeanette Hain on filmportal.de

1969 births
German film actresses
Living people
Actresses from Munich
21st-century German actresses